Squalodon is an extinct genus of whales of the Oligocene and Miocene epochs, belonging to the family Squalodontidae. Named by Jean-Pierre Sylvestre de Grateloup in 1840, it was originally believed to be an iguanodontid dinosaur but has since been reclassified. The name Squalodon comes from Squalus, a genus of shark.  As a result, its name means "shark tooth". Its closest modern relative is the South Asian river dolphin (with its two subspecies the Ganges river dolphin and Indus river dolphin).

Description 
 
Species of Squalodon are odontocetes that lived during the late Oligocene into the middle Miocene, about 28 to 15 million years ago. The genus Squalodon belongs to the order Odontoceti, the toothed whales. They are named after the shark Squalus because their cheek teeth look like the teeth of a squalus shark. The largest species, Squalodon whitmorei, reached up to 5.5 meters in length. The unique-looking squalodontids were likely distributed throughout the world in warm waters during the Oligocene and Miocene. Squalodontidae became extinct in the middle of the Miocene, leaving no descendants. Hypotheses of why this family lead to extinction have to deal with competition of other groups of dolphins as well as climate change.

Ancestral and modern features 
These whales are characterized by both ancestral and modern features. Their teeth are the most evident ancestral feature. At this time in history other toothed whales were evolving simple conical teeth while Squalodontidae retained their primitive dentition that their ancestors (the archaeocetes) had developed. Today living odontocetes have little variation in their teeth. Squalodontids' teeth are much more complex: they are widely spaced apart; their cheek teeth are triangular and serrated for grasping and cutting. Due to the efficiency of their primitive dentition squalodontids could have a diverse variety of prey. 
Another ancestral quality of the Squalodontidae is their necks. Squalodontid necks are more compressed than their ancestors, the Archaeoceti. Compared to toothed whales at that time, the squalodontids were likely more mobile. Paleontologists also believe that the dorsal fins were reduced but larger than that of the ancestors. 
Shark toothed whales also possess many modern features. Their crania were well compressed, their rostrums were telescoped outward, and their skulls show proof of the origin of echolocation.

Fossil record and classification
Fossils of this genus are identified mainly by the teeth but several different species have been named based on skull characteristics and size (the biggest being S. whitmorei). Most of the fossil record consists of teeth. These odontocete fossils have been discovered in Europe, eastern North America, New Zealand, and Argentina. Because isolated teeth are insufficient for species identification, most specimens lacking the skull can only be identified to genus. The fossils of squalodontids indicate that this species is more closely related to endangered species of dolphins and not to most of the living dolphins today. 
 
The systematic placement of Squalodon within Odontoceti was long unclear. For a long time, it was thought to be close of the ancestry of modern dolphins and porpoise. Many of the fresh-water dolphins are differentiated phylogenetically very well, while the argument of some of the species has been going on for more than a century. The taxon is characterized during the Oligocene and Miocene in which heterodont teeth are standard amongst the family. Some modern features of the scapula, however, contradict with current phylogenetic relationships. Squalodontids were believed to be the last common ancestor of the odontocetes until 1984. Muizon came to the conclusion that rather than to any of the living species this family is closer related to the endangered species. Therefore, the ancestry of today's dolphins has little to do with the squalodontids.

Species
 
 
 
As the type genus of Squalodontidae, Squalodon has become a repository for various squalodontids or even taxa that were once thought to belong to Squalodontidae. However, there has been no revision of Squalodon.

Species currently recognized as valid
 Squalodon grateloupii Meyer, 1843 (type species)
 Squalodon antverpiensis van Beneden, 1861
 Squalodon bariensis (Jourdan 1861)
 Squalodon barbarus Mchedlidze and Aslanova 1968
 Squalodon calvertensis Kellogg 1923
 Squalodon whitmorei Dooley 2005
 Squalodon catulli Molin 1859

Questionably or originally assigned to Squalodon
 Arionus servatus Meyer, 1841 = Squalodon meyeri Brandt, 1873
 Pachyodon mirabilis Meyer, 1838
 Rhytisodon tuberculatus Costa, 1852
 Smilocamptus burgueti Gervais, 1859
 Phocodon melitensis (Blainville, 1840) = Phoca melitensis Blainville, 1840 = Phocodon scillae Agassiz, 1841
 "Squalodon" kelloggi Rothausen, 1968
 Squalodon bellunensis Dal Piaz, 1901
 Squalodon peregrinus Dal Piaz, 1971
 Squalodon imperator Cigala-Fulgosi & Pilleri, 1985
 Squalodon gambierensisGlaessner 1955

See also 

Evolution of cetaceans
Toothed whale

References

External links
 Squalodon Facts and Information: Fossilguy.com
 Tree of Life
 Otago University
 Calvert Marine Museum
The Free Dictionary
Shark-toothed dolphins (Family Squalodontidae)
Family †Squalodontidae – Hierarchy – The Taxonomicon

Miocene mammals of South America
Miocene mammals of North America
Miocene mammals of Europe
Miocene mammals of Oceania
Oligocene mammals of South America
Oligocene mammals of North America
Oligocene mammals of Europe
Oligocene mammals of Oceania
Prehistoric toothed whales
Oligocene cetaceans
Miocene cetaceans
Miocene genus extinctions
Prehistoric cetacean genera
Fossil taxa described in 1840
Rupelian genus first appearances
Fossil cetaceans misidentified as reptiles